The Olsen Gang in Jutland is a 1971 Danish comedy film directed by Erik Balling and starring Ove Sprogøe. The film was the third installment in the Olsen Gang-series.

Plot
The film starts like most of the Olsen-gang films, with Egon being released from The State Prison in Vridsløselille. The gang goes back home to Kjeld and Yvonne to discuss their next caper. Unlike most other Olsen Gang films, this heist takes place in Jutland. Egon has obtained a map for a treasure stored in an old German command bunker on the west coast. To get to Jutland they must cross the then newly built Little Belt Bridge. But two other criminals (Helle Virkner and Willy Rathnov) have also got wind of the story. The Olsen Gang do not make it easier for themselves by taking Yvonne along. They mistakenly believe that it will be easy to fool the locals - especially they misjudge the wily scrap dealer (Karl Stegger) and his mute assistant (Preben Kaas). They soon become much, much wiser. A bomb left over from the war gives Kjeld a short, but very significant, shell shock, which causes him to stylishly carry out a terrific ride in a runaway dump. Not surprisingly, a planned Majorca trip gets postponed.

Cast
 Ove Sprogøe as Egon Olsen
 Morten Grunwald as Benny Frandsen
 Poul Bundgaard as Kjeld Jensen
 Kirsten Walther as Yvonne Jensen
 Jes Holtsø as Børge Jensen
 Helle Virkner as Karen
 Willy Rathnov as Rico
 Karl Stegger as Mads 'Penny' Madsen
 Preben Kaas as Small Ass
 Peter Steen as Løjtnanten
  as Menig '667345'
 Ernst Meyer as Tank Man
 Gunnar Strømvad as Chauffeaur

Production

References

External links
 
 

1971 films
1971 comedy films
Danish comedy films
1970s Danish-language films
Films directed by Erik Balling
Films with screenplays by Erik Balling
1970s heist films
Olsen-banden films